Opostegoides minodensis is a moth of the family Opostegidae. It is found in Japan.

There is probably one generation per year with adults on wing from the end of June to mid-July.

The larvae feed on Betula platyphylla var. japonica. They mine the cambium of their host plant, creating slender elliptical mines. Mine traces, or pith flecks, are found on both sides of the winter ring layer, with the smaller, younger mines always on the inner side of the ring and the larger, more mature mines on the outside.

External links
A Revision of the New World Plant-Mining Moths of the Family Opostegidae (Lepidoptera: Nepticuloidea)
Distribution of pith flecks caused by the cambium miner, Opostegoides minodensis, in Japanese white birch

Opostegidae
Moths of Japan
Moths described in 1982